Mechanics Grove is an unincorporated community located within East Drumore Township in Lancaster County, Pennsylvania. Mechanics Grove is located along U.S. Route 222 south of the town of Quarryville.

References

Unincorporated communities in Lancaster County, Pennsylvania
Unincorporated communities in Pennsylvania